King Drive station is a station on the Chicago Transit Authority's 'L' system. It is located in the Woodlawn neighborhood of Chicago, Illinois and serves the Green Line's East 63rd branch. The station is situated at 400 East 63rd Street. The station opened on May 1, 1893. King Drive only allows boarding on the inbound platform (towards Harlem); the outbound platform (towards Cottage Grove) is exit-only.

Bus connections 
CTA
 3 King Drive
 N4 Cottage Grove (Owl Service)
 63 63rd (Owl Service)

References

External links 

King Drive Station Page at Chicago-L.org
King Drive entrance from Google Maps Street View

CTA Green Line stations
Railway stations in the United States opened in 1893
Former North Shore Line stations
1893 establishments in Illinois